Jarmanpreet Singh (born 18 July 1996) is an Indian field hockey player who plays as a defender. He made his international debut at the 2018 Men's Hockey Champions Trophy in Breda where India won the silver medal.

References

External links
Jarmanpreet Singh at Hockey India

1996 births
Living people
Field hockey players from Amritsar
Indian male field hockey players
Male field hockey defenders
Field hockey players at the 2022 Commonwealth Games
Commonwealth Games silver medallists for India
Commonwealth Games medallists in field hockey
2023 Men's FIH Hockey World Cup players
Medallists at the 2022 Commonwealth Games